Red Valley/Cove High School is a high school in the community of Red Valley, Arizona, also serving Cove, Arizona. It is operated by the Red Mesa Unified School District. It was created to allow students in the Red Valley and Cove area to attend high school within Arizona; prior to Red Valley/Cove's opening, these areas were served by schools in New Mexico.

The school, with a campus built in 2006, opened in 2007 with 27 students; 3 of them graduated that year. As of 2015 the employees include five teachers, seven classified staff members, a principal, and two bus drivers. The campus is in proximity to the Arizona-New Mexico state line. The sports team is the "Miners".

The school became a member of the Arizona Interscholastic Association in the 2013–14 school year.

References

External links
 Red Valley/Cove High School

Public high schools in Arizona
Educational institutions established in 2006
Schools in Apache County, Arizona
Education on the Navajo Nation
2006 establishments in Arizona